Jílové u Držkova is a municipality and village in Jablonec nad Nisou District in the Liberec Region of the Czech Republic. It has about 200 inhabitants.

References

Villages in Jablonec nad Nisou District